Patricia Caicedo (born 1969) is a Colombian-Spanish classical soprano and musicologist who specializes in the study and performance of the Latin American and Spanish art song repertoire in Spanish, Catalan, Portuguese and Indigenous languages. She is also a trained physician.

Life and career
Born in the Colombian city of Ibagué, Patricia Caicedo started studying music in her childhood at the Conservatorio de música del Tolima. She began singing in her teens, initially singing folk Latin American music. In 1992, after completing medical studies at the Escuela Colombiana de Medicina, she initiated voice studies at the Conservatorio del Tolima and later in Barcelona and New York. She studied with Rocio Rios, Alfredo Kraus, Maya Maiska, and Gilberto Escobar.

In 1993, she made her professional debut at the International Festival of Classical Music, accompanied by the Tolima Symphony Orchestra. She performed as a soloist in Juan Crisóstomo Arriaga's Stabat Mater and Pergolesi's Stabat Mater and in other recitals. In 1993, she received first prize in the Concurso Nacional del Bambuco competition, and in 1998 she was named best classical soloist in Colombia by Sony Music.

Patricia Caicedo specialized in Latin American and Iberian vocal repertoire. In this area she has published several books and CDs and frequently gives master classes, lectures, and recitals in European and American universities.[5][7][8]  In 2013 she completed a PhD in musicology at the Universidad Complutense de Madrid, her dissertation title is The Latin American Art Song: National Identity, Performance Practice and the Worlds of Art.

Since 2001 Caicedo has developed a busy concert and recording agenda. She has recorded eleven albums dedicated to the Latin American and Iberian Art Song repertoire in Spanish, Catalan and Portuguese [6] . Patricia has published several books, articles and CDs related to the Latin American, Catalan and Iberian vocal repertoire.

A co-founder of the Latin American Art Song Alliance (LAASA), Caicedo founded Mundo Arts, a company that publishes and distributes Latin American art song.

In 2005, she founded the Barcelona Festival of Song, an annual summer program for classical singers and a concert series dedicated to the study of the history and interpretation of the Latin American and Iberian vocal repertoire. The festival arrived to its seventeen edition in 2021.

Since 2008, Caicedo was included in the Who's Who in America.  Published by Marquis Who's Who is the leading biographical reference publisher of the highest achievers and contributors from across the country and around the world. Her inclusion represents a tribute to her discipline and hard work as an advocate of the Latin American and Spanish Music. Since 2010 Patricia is also included in the Who's Who in American Women and Who´s Who in the World.

In 2014, she created EYECatalunya, an interactive Internet platform dedicated to internationally promote Catalan creativity.

In 2020 Patricia was elected as an Executive Board Member of the International Music Council, an organization founded in 1949 by UNESCO.  The IMC is the world's largest network of organizations and institutions working in the field of music. It promotes access to music for all and the value of music in the lives of all people.

In 2020 the National Association of Teachers of Singing (NATS) of the United States highlighted Patricia's contribution to the diversity in vocal performance and research. In the same year, the European Voice Teacher Association invited her as a keynote speaker at EUROVOX the congress of the association.

In 2022 Patricia was invited as a visiting scholar at the Iberian and Latin American Music Center of the University of California Riverside, where she spent six months.  In the same year she presented lectures and masterclasses at Montclair University, George Mason University, CalPoly, New York University, University of North Carolina School of the Arts, University of California Irvine., Texas Christian University  the University of Texas Rio Grande  She presented a Masterclass of Latin American and Iberian Art Songs at the International Congress of Voice Teachers in Vienna. and a lecture about digital musicology at the Annual Meeting of the American Musicological Society in New Orleans.

Since 1998, Caicedo has lived in Barcelona, Spain, and has double citizenship, Colombian and Spanish.

Publications
Caicedo's publications include:

Books 
 Anthology of Latin American and Iberian Art Songs by Women Composers Vol. 2. Barcelona: Mundoarts Publications, 2022.
We are what we listen to: the impact of music on individual and social health. Barcelona: Mundoarts Publications, 2021.
Somos lo que escuchamos: impacto de la música en la salud individual y social. Barcelona: Mundoarts Publications, 2021.
Latin American and Iberian Art Songs by Women Composers. Barcelona: Mundoarts Publications, 2020.
Spanish Diction for Singers: A Practical Guide for the Pronunciation of the Peninsular and American Spanish. Barcelona: Mundoarts Publications, 2020.
The Latin American Art Song, Sounds of Imagined Nations. Maryland: Lexington Press, 2018.
Los sonidos de las naciones imaginadas: la canción artística latinoamericana en el contexto del nacionalismo musical. Barcelona: Mundo Arts Publications y Fundación Autor, 2018.
The Argentinian Art Song: Irma Urteaga, Complete Songs for Voice and Piano, Barcelona: Mundoarts Publications, 2017. 
The Latin American Art Song: Critical Anthology and Interpretive Guide for Singers. Barcelona: Tritó, 2005
The Colombian Art Song: Jaime León, analysis and compilation of his works for voice and piano. New York: Mundo Arts Publications, 2009.
The Bolivian Art Song: Alquimia, Song Cycle by Agustín Fernández. Barcelona: Mundo Arts Publications, New York, MA003, 2012.
El Barcelona Festival of Song: construyendo una narrativa para la canción Ibérica y latinoamericana. Barcelona: Mundo Arts Publications, MA004, 2014.

Articles 
Caicedo has also published articles on various subjects, including:
 
 
Decolonizing Classical Singers’ Minds: The Latin American and Iberian Art Song Repertoire, Australian Voice, Volume 20, 2019
Deconstructing the center and the peripheries: a proposal for a 4E performance practice of the Latin American art song. ICREA Colloquium. (Barcelona: February, 2019).
Caicedo, Patricia, "Marcel Duchamp y la performance practice de la canción artística latinoamericana" in Música y construcción de identidades: poéticas, diálogos y utopías en Latinoamérica y España, Rodriguez, Victoria Ed. 1-25. Madrid, Sociedad Española de Musicología, 2018.
"Marcel Duchamp y la performance practice de la canción artística latinoamericana in  Música e identidades en Latinoamérica y España. Procesos, ideológicos, estéticos y creativos en el siglo XX". Universidad Complutense de Madrid.
"Lo real, lo virtual y el interespacio: nuevas formas de ser músico y hacer música en la era digital", Actas del congreso MUCA, Universidad de Murcia, 2015.
"The Latin-American Art Song Repertoire" in Singing. Voice of the Association of Teachers of Singing. AOTOS, UK. Spring, 2013.
"Discovering Latin-American Art Song Through Song and Poetry’ in VoicePrints, Vol. 9 Jan-Feb, 2012.
 
"Agua, espejo y puente: El papel de la mujer  en la creación, desarrollo y difusión de la canción artística  latinoamericana" in Papeles de Cadiz, Universidad de Cádiz, 2006.
"La canción artística en América Latina: formas clásicas de vender fresas en las calles". ILAASA, University of Texas at Austin, 2003.
"Giaccomo Puccini: El hombre detrás del artista in Amadeus, No.87, Barcelona, 2000.
"Carmen: una mujer de hoy" in Amadeus No.83, RBA revistas, Barcelona, 2000.'
"El lied Latinoamericano: hacia un redescubrimiento musical de América" in Amadeus No.78, RBA Revistas, Barcelona, 1999.

Recordings
Caicedo's recordings include:
 Nuestros dias: poemas de amor hechos canción. Barcelona: Mundo Arts Records, 2021.
Signat l´amic del cor. Barcelona: Mundo Arts Records, 2020.
Más que nunca: Colombian Art Songs by Jaime León. Barcelona: Mundo Arts Records & Fundación Autor, 2019
Miraba la noche el alma: Art Songs by Latin American & Catalan Composers. Barcelona: Mundo Arts Records, 2016.
 Amb veu de dona: Catalan Art Songs by Women Composers. Barcelona: Mundo Arts Records, 2016.
 De Catalunya vinc… Catalan Art Songs of the XX & XXI Centuries. Barcelona: Mundo Arts Records, 2015.
 Jaime Leon: Aves y Ensueños (Colombian Art Songs), 2011. Label: Mundo Arts Records
 Estrela É Lúa Nova - un Viaje por América Latina y España (A journey through Latin-America & Spain'), 2011. Label: Mundo Arts Records
 De Mi Corazón Latino- Latin Songs of all times, 2010. Label: Mundo Arts Records
 A mi ciudad nativa - Art Songs of Latin America Vol. 2, 2005. Label: Mundo Arts Records
 Lied: Art Songs of Latin America, 2001. Label: Edicions Albert Moraleda

Awards, Grants and, Recognition
 Premio Brasil Ibermúsicas given to the Barcelona Festival of Song. December, 2022 
 Book Publication award given by Fundación Autor for the book Somos lo que escuchamos, impacto de la música en la salud individual y social. 2021.
 10 colombianos destacados en España. Given by the Colombian Embassy in Spain. December, 2021 
 BCC Award for Arts and Culture. December, 2021 
 Featured on the National Association of Teachers of Singing (NATS). 
 Book Publication award given by Fundación Autor for the book Somos lo que escuchamos, impacto de la música en la salud individual y social, 2022.
 Artist Internationalization Grant - CatalanArts , 2021.
 Elected as a Board Member of the International Music Council. Served from 2020 to  December 2021.
 Composition Grant given by Fundación Autor. Ayudas a la composición de músicas populares given by Fundación Autor - SGAE. 2020.
 CD Publication award given by Fundación Autor for the CD Signat l´amic del cor, 2019.
 Book Publication award given by Fundación Autor for the book Los sonidos de las naciones imaginadas, 2017.
 Named Honorary Member of the Brazilian Voice Teacher Association. (ABCanto). 2017.
 CD Recording and Publication grant. Grant “Enregistraments Especial interés cultural i patrimonial” for the CD of Catalan Art Songs by Women Composers. Given by the Department de Cultura de la Generalitat de Catalunya for heritage preservation. 2016.
 CD Recording and Publication grant. Grant “Enregistraments Especial interés cultural i patrimonial” for the recording of the CD De Catalunya Vinc. Given by the Department de Cultura de la Generalitat de Catalunya for heritage preservation. 2015.
 Included in Who’s Who in America. 2008.
 Included in Who´s Who in American Women. 2009
 Scholarship to attend the congress: Autoras y Actrices en la historia del Teatro Español. Palacio de Valparaíso. Almagro, Spain. June 18- 20, 1999.
 First Prize in the Classical Music category.SONY le canta a Colombia Music competition. Bogotá, Colombia, 1998.
 Mención de honor XVIII Festival Folclórico Nacional. Instituto Huílense de Cultura. Neiva, Huila, 1997.
 First Prize as a Vocal Soloist. Concurso Nacional del Bambuco. Pereira, Colombia. 1993.
 First Prize as a Vocal Soloist. Concurso de Interpretación de Música Andina Colombiana Colono de Oro. Florencia, Colombia, 1993.
 First Prize Composition and Interpretation. Concurso Nacional de la Canción Cristiana. Bogotá, Colombia. 1986.

References

External links
Official Website
Works by Patricia Caicedo on WorldCat
Patricia Caicedo’s Perfect Day in Barcelona on Homage to BCN
Articles by Patricia Caicedo on Academia.edu
Article about Patricia at the Acadèmia Catalana de la Música

21st-century Colombian women singers
Sopranos
Colombian musicologists
Women musicologists
Colombian classical musicians
1969 births
Living people
20th-century Colombian women singers